The Kadayawan Festival is an annual festival in the city of Davao in the Philippines. The festival is a celebration of life, a thanksgiving for the gifts of nature, the wealth of culture, the bounties of harvest and serenity of living.  

The festival was previously known as Apo Duwaling Festival, named after three icons of Davao; Mount Apo, durian, and the waling-waling orchid.  

Previously, this festival was held in the third week of August every year which was highlighting the 11 tribes of Davao City. In 2019, the celebration was extended and held from 2 to 31 August. In 2020, Kadayawan Festival was celebrated from 10 to 17 August.

One of the highlights of the Kadayawan Festival is the Indak-Indak sa Kadalanan, which translates to street dancing. This is a showcase of the diverse indigenous cultures of the region. The festivities feature different communities in Mindanao dancing in vibrant costumes that highlight their indigenous heritage.

History
In 1970, Mayor Elias B. Lopez encouraged all the Davao tribes to showcase their thanksgiving rituals. In 1986, the Davao City government focused on uniting the people in the turbulent times of martial law. At this time the festival was called "Apo Duwaling". This name was created as a combination of three natural wonders: Mt. Apo, Durian, and Waling-waling.

In 1988, the festival was officially named "Kadayawan Festival" by then Mayor (now former Philippine President) Rodrigo Duterte.

References

External links
 Philippines Information Agency
 Official website of Kadayawan Festival
 Davao City official website

Mindanao festivals
Culture of Davao City
Tourist attractions in Davao City
Harvest festivals